The Crêt du Midi is a mountain of the Pennine Alps, overlooking Vercorin in the canton of Valais. The summit is accessible by cable car from Chalais or Vercorin (near Sierre).

See also
List of mountains of Switzerland accessible by public transport

References

External links
 Crêt du Midi on Hikr
 Crêt du Midi on MySwitzerland

Mountains of the Alps
Mountains of Switzerland
Mountains of Valais
Two-thousanders of Switzerland